Terrett Butte, also called the Turret Buttes, are a prominent landmark on the east side of the Powder River in south-central Powder River County, Montana. They are better known today as the Turret Buttes because of their resemblance to a castle or gun turret.

History 

The first time the buttes were mentioned in writing was on September 12, 1865, in the diary of Major Lyman G. Bennett, the chief engineering officer accompanying Colonel Nelson D. Cole's column of the Powder River Expedition.  Bennett wrote:

The buttes appear on maps from the 1880s and were likely named after a homesteading family whose last name was Terret or Terrett. From around 1915 until the 1940s a rural country schoolhouse called the Terret Butte School was situated along the east side of the Powder River below the buttes. During the mid-20th century, the buttes were located on the Swope Family Ranch. Between the early 1980s and 2005, the buttes were owned by Andrew L. Lewis Jr., the 7th United States Secretary of Transportation. Today they are a part of the Held Family Ranch.

Location 

References 

Buttes of Montana
Landforms of Powder River County, Montana